Son en Breugel is a municipality in the southern Netherlands just outside Eindhoven. Son en Breugel used to be two different villages: 'Son' and 'Breugel', with the stream the Dommel separating the two villages. Son en Breugel also borders the following larger municipalities: Eindhoven, Meierijstad, Nuenen, Gerwen en Nederwetten, and Best.
The spoken language is North Meierijs (an East Brabantian dialect, which is very similar to colloquial Dutch).

Population centres 

Breugel
Son

Dutch topographic map of the municipality of Son en Breugel, June 2015

History
The villages of Son and Breugel were founded between the 12th and 14th centuries. The villages developed quickly; some 300 households (150 household for each village) occupied the two villages during the 15th century.

According to Karel van Mander's 1604 Schilder-boeck, the painter Pieter Bruegel the Elder was born in the village of Breugel.

Both Son as well as Breugel were hit badly during the Eighty Years' War, and the number of households in the two villages shrank down to approximately 140 (which translates to approximately 600 - 800 inhabitants). However, both villages managed to recover from this setback.

During the reign of Napoleon, both villages were finally combined into one municipality. Until the beginning of the 20th century, the population stayed relatively stable at about 1,500 inhabitants. However, between 1910 and 1940 the population increased from 1,600 to 3,500 inhabitants when people started moving to the village for economic reasons. It was the scene of heavy fighting at the end of the Second World War, particularly during Operation Market Garden. From 1960 onwards, Son en Breugel continued to grow. As of August 2002, the number of inhabitants was estimated at 15,000.

Future
Currently, the number of households in Son en Breugel has reached 6,000. The combined village is expected to grow by about 3,000 households in the coming years, a growth of 50% (to be confirmed after a MER investigation as of March 2008), the result of which would prevent the municipality from being absorbed within the larger neighbouring municipality of Eindhoven.

Starting early 2009, a new neighbourhood will be developed within the combined village. This neighbourhood, called 'Sonniuspark', will contain 600 households and will be finished in 2013.

Politics
This municipality has a local council of 17 seats with the following distribution:
!style="background-color:#E9E9E9" align=center colspan=2|Party
!style="background-color:#E9E9E9" align=right|Seats
|-
|bgcolor="#d3d3d3" width=2|
|align=left|Village Vision Son en Breugel||
|-
| 
|align=left|People's Party for Freedom and Democracy||
|-
| 
|align=left|Christian Democratic Appeal||
|-
|bgcolor="#d3d3d3" width=2|
|align=left|Village Interests Son en Breugel||
|-
| 
|align=left|Labour Party-GreenLeft||
|-
| 
|align=left|Democrats 66||
|-
|}

Notable people born in Son en Breugel 
 Franciscus Sonnius (1506-1576) - a theologian, the first Bishop of 's-Hertogenbosch and later the first Bishop of Antwerp
 Antoon van de Ven (1867-1934) - farmer and mayor
 Menno Oosting (1964-1999) - a professional tennis player
 Bart Oomen (1964) - Dutch actor
 Adri Vogels (1941-2022) - soccer player and coach
 Michiel de Vaan (1973) - Dutch linguist and Indo-Europeanist
 Willemijn Verkaik (1975) - Dutch singer and actress

Gallery

References

External links

Official website

 
Municipalities of North Brabant
Pieter Bruegel the Elder